Whip Inflation Now (WIN) was a 1974 attempt to spur a grassroots movement to combat inflation in the US, by encouraging personal savings and disciplined spending habits in combination with public measures, urged by U.S. President Gerald Ford. The campaign was later described as "one of the biggest government public relations blunders ever".

People who supported the mandatory and voluntary measures were encouraged to wear "WIN" buttons, perhaps in hope of evoking in peacetime the kind of solidarity and voluntarism symbolized by the V-campaign during World War II.

Campaign

Ford had taken office in August 1974 amidst one of the worst economic crises in US history, marked by high unemployment and inflation rising to 12.3% that year following the 1973 oil crisis. As a Republican, Ford favored the WIN campaign's emphasis on addressing the problem through voluntary actions of citizens, instead of price restrictions imposed centrally by a big government bureaucracy.

The campaign began in earnest with the establishment by the 93rd Congress of the National Commission on Inflation, which Ford closed with an address to the American people, asking them to send him a list of ten inflation-reducing ideas. Ten days later, Ford declared inflation "public enemy number one" before Congress on October 8, 1974, in a speech entitled "Whip Inflation Now", announcing a series of proposals for public and private steps intended to directly affect supply and demand to bring inflation under control. Suggested actions for citizens included carpooling, turning down thermostats, and starting their own vegetable gardens.

"WIN" buttons immediately became objects of ridicule; skeptics wore the buttons upside down, explaining that "NIM" stood for "No Immediate Miracles," "Nonstop Inflation Merry-go-round," or "Need Immediate Money."

Alan Greenspan, as the Chairman of the Council of Economic Advisors during the Ford administration, went along reluctantly with the "Whip Inflation Now" campaign, but would later recall in his book The Age of Turbulence that he was thinking, "This is unbelievably stupid" when the concept was first presented to the White House. According to historian Yanek Mieczkowski, the public campaign was never meant to be the centerpiece of the anti-inflation program.

Gallery

See also
 I'm Backing Britain
 Inflation Reduction Act of 2022

References

External links 

"Whip Inflation Now" speech by Gerald Ford, Miller Center of Public Affairs. Includes transcript and video.
James D. Hamilton: WIN buttons and Arthur Burns. Econbrowser blog, December 29, 2006 

American political catchphrases
Presidency of Gerald Ford
1974 in American politics
Inflation
1974 in economics
Public awareness campaigns
1974 neologisms